This list of administrative communes consists of articles about the governmental divisions known as communes, as well as lists of communes.

Algeria
Under the French the baladiyahs, the third level of administrative division, were called communes, see List of municipalities of Algeria

Angola
Communes of Angola, the third level administrative division

Argentina
 Communes of Argentina

Burkina Faso
Departments of Burkina Faso (also known as communes), the lowest level of administrative division

Burundi
Communes of Burundi

Cambodia
Communes of Cambodia, third-level administrative division

Cameroon
Communes of Cameroon, third-level administrative division

Chad
Communes of Chad

Chile
Communes of Chile, the third and lowest level administrative division of the country, comprising cities, towns, villages, hamlets, and unsettled areas

People's Republic of China
People's commune, an administrative division of the rural area in the People's Republic of China between 1958–1984

Denmark
List of municipalities of Denmark, in Danish: kommuner (sing.: kommune). Kommuner were introduced in the Danish constitution in 1849 in order to administer aid to the poor, provide education and later on to handle tax collection. The system has been revised many times throughout history, most recently in 2007, where the number of kommuner was reduced from 270 to 98.

Democratic Republic of Congo
Communes of Kinshasa

Finland
List of municipalities of Finland (Finnish: kunta; Swedish: kommun)

France
Communes of France, the lowest level of administrative division, comprising cities, towns, and villages
Lists of communes of France

Germany
Communes of Germany

Haiti
Arrondissements of Haiti, below districts
List of communes of Haiti, the lowest level of administrative division

Italy
Comune, equivalent to a municipality 
 List of communes of the Province of Agrigento
 List of communes of the Province of Alessandria
 List of communes of the Province of Ancona
 List of communes of the Province of Arezzo
 List of communes of the Province of Ascoli Piceno
 List of communes of the Province of Asti
 List of communes of the Province of Avellino
 List of communes of the Province of Bari
 List of communes of the Province of Belluno
 List of communes of the Province of Bergamo
 List of communes of the Province of Benevento
 List of communes of the Province of Biella
 List of communes of the Province of Bologna
 List of communes of the Province of Brescia
 List of communes of the Province of Brindisi
 List of communes of the Province of Cagliari
 List of communes of the Province of Caltanissetta
 List of communes of the Province of Campobasso
 List of communes of the Province of Carbonia-Iglesias
 List of communes of the Province of Caserta
 List of communes of the Province of Catania
 List of communes of the Province of Catanzaro
 List of communes of the Province of Chieti
 List of communes of the Province of Como
 List of communes of the Province of Cosenza
 List of communes of the Province of Cremona
 List of communes of the Province of Crotone
 List of communes of the Province of Cuneo
 List of communes of the Province of Enna
 List of communes of the Province of Fermo
 List of communes of the Province of Ferrara
 List of communes of the Province of Florence
 List of communes of the Province of Foggia
 List of communes of the Province of Forlì-Cesena
 List of communes of the Province of Frosinone
 List of communes of the Province of Genoa
 List of communes of the Province of Gorizia
 List of communes of the Province of Grosseto
 List of communes of the Province of Imperia
 List of communes of the Province of Isernia
 List of communes of the Province of L'Aquila
 List of communes of the Province of La Spezia
 List of communes of the Province of Latina
 List of communes of the Province of Lecce
 List of communes of the Province of Lecco
 List of communes of the Province of Livorno
 List of communes of the Province of Lodi
 List of communes of the Province of Lucca
 List of communes of the Province of Macerata
 List of communes of the Province of Mantua
Comuni of the Province of Massa-Carrara
 List of communes of the Province of Matera
 List of communes of the Province of Medio Campidano
 List of communes of the Province of Messina
 List of communes of the Province of Milan
 List of communes of the Province of Modena
Comuni of the Province of Monza and of Brianza
 List of communes of the Province of Naples
 List of communes of the Province of Novara
 List of communes of the Province of Nuoro
 List of communes of the Province of Ogliastra
 List of communes of the Province of Olbia-Tempio
 List of communes of the Province of Oristano
 List of communes of the Province of Padua
 List of communes of the Province of Palermo
 List of communes of the Province of Parma
 List of communes of the Province of Pavia
 List of communes of the Province of Perugia
 List of communes of the Province of Pesaro e Urbino
 List of communes of the Province of Pescara
 List of communes of the Province of Piacenza
 List of communes of the Province of Pisa
 List of communes of the Province of Pistoia
 List of communes of the Province of Pordenone
 List of communes of the Province of Potenza
Comuni of the Province of Prato
 List of communes of the Province of Ragusa
 List of communes of the Province of Ravenna
 List of communes of the Province of Reggio Calabria
 List of communes of the Province of Reggio Emilia
 List of communes of the Province of Rieti
 List of communes of the Province of Rimini
 List of communes of the Province of Rome
 List of communes of the Province of Rovigo
 List of communes of the Province of Salerno
 List of communes of the Province of Sassari
 List of communes of the Province of Savona
 List of communes of the Province of Siena
 List of communes of the Province of Sondrio
Municipalities of South Tyrol
 List of communes of the Province of Syracuse
 List of communes of the Province of Taranto
 List of communes of the Province of Teramo
 List of communes of the Province of Terni
 List of communes of the Province of Treviso
 List of communes of the Province of Trieste
 List of communes of the Province of Trapani
Communes of Trentino
 List of communes of the Province of Turin
 List of communes of the Province of Udine
 List of communes of the Province of Varese
 List of communes of the Province of Venice
 List of communes of the Province of Verbano-Cusio-Ossola
 List of communes of the Province of Vercelli (very incomplete)
 List of communes of the Province of Verona
 List of communes of the Province of Vibo Valentia
 List of communes of the Province of Vicenza
 List of communes of the Province of Viterbo

Luxembourg
Communes of Luxembourg, the lowest uniform level of administrative division
List of communes of Luxembourg
List of communes of Luxembourg by population
List of communes of Luxembourg by population density
List of communes of Luxembourg by area
List of communes of Luxembourg in different languages
List of communes of Luxembourg by lowest point

Mali
Communes of Mali, the third level of administrative division

Moldova
List of localities in Moldova, which includes communes

Niger
Communes of Niger, the third level of administrative division

Norway
List of municipalities of Norway (kommuner)

Poland
Gmina, the lowest uniform level of administrative division
List of Polish gminas

Romania
Communes of Romania, comprising villages

Senegal
Communes of Senegal

Sweden
Municipalities of Sweden (kommun), the lowest level administrative division of the country, comprising cities, towns, villages, hamlets, and unsettled areas
List of municipalities of Sweden

Switzerland
Municipalities of Switzerland, called communes in French

Tunisia
List of cities in Tunisia

Vietnam
Communes of Vietnam

Society-related lists